"Kultanaamio" is the second single from CMX's 1994 album Aura. It also appears on the group's first compilation album Cloaca Maxima. "Kultanaamio" means "Golden Mask" in Finnish.

Helsingin sanomat published in 2007 the top 50 Finnish rock songs as voted by readers. "Kultanaamio" placed third after "Moottoritie on kuuma" by Pelle Miljoona and "Get On" by Hurriganes. The top 10 also included CMX's previous single, "Ruoste".

Interpretation
Music journalist Tero Valkonen wrote in 1998 an analysis of the lyrics of "Kultanaamio". It was published in Rumba magazine, 24/1998, as a part of a column series about important Finnish rock lyricists. Valkonen argues that, even though the song is disguised as a catchy pop tune, it conseals "an immense amount of disappointment, suffering and falsehood" that may not be instantly noticeable. Indeed, the song starts with the phrase "I hate you."

Track listing
"Kultanaamio" (single version) – 4:39
"Kultanaamio" (album version) – 4:56
"Keskellä" – 2:18

Personnel
A. W. Yrjänä – bass, vocals
Janne Halmkrona – guitar
Timo Rasio – guitar, backing vocals
Pekka Kanniainen – drums
Mara Salminen – keyboards
Risto Salmi – saxophone
Henna Valvanne
Frida Segerstråle
Kaarina Kilpiö

See also 
 CMX discography

References

External links
The song's lyrics on cmx.fi

CMX (band)
Finnish songs
1994 singles
1994 songs